It's the Evil is the debut studio album by Canadian punk rock band White Lung, released on June 15, 2010 on Deranged Records.

Track listing
All songs written and composed by White Lung
"Viva La Rat" - 1:50
"Atlanta" - 2:36
"Sleep Creep" - 1:54
"Two Seen" - 2:55
"Elf/546 Kids" - 3:25
"Psychoholic" - 1:40
"Shoot" - 2:21
"Loose Heels" - 1:25
"Like Dad" - 2:29
"Tale" - 2:00
"Wild Failure" - 2:13

Personnel
Mish Way – vocals
Kenneth William – guitar
Grady Mackintosh – bass guitar
Anne-Marie Vassiliou – drums

References

Punk rock albums by Canadian artists
2010 debut albums
White Lung albums
Deranged Records albums